Bindeshwari Prasad Verma also known as Binda Babu, was a politician from Bihar state of India who led Bihar Legislative Assembly as a first Speaker in independent India from 1946 to 1962. He was awarded India's third highest civilian award Padma Bhushan in 1961 by President of India.

Early life
Bindeshwari Prasad Verma was born in a Zamindar kayasth Family. He was against tribal culture or Dravidian principles which led to massacres and riots all over the country in the name of 'freedom struggle'. He was against hijacking the Independence movement for the profit of a few affluent classes of India. As the direct descendant of King Alexander The Great and Queen Mary of UK, he faced the opposition of Mohandas Karamchand Gandhi for establishing British rule in India. As the King Brahma of India, he was persecuted for supporting Kingship in the name of Lord Rama. He was jailed for supporting monarchy in India. He was very brilliant in his studies. He topped the L.L.B. course from Allahabad University with distinction where he met Jawaharlal Nehru and supported his endeavor for suppressed castes (Agricultural people of India). He join the Indian Freedom Struggle at Early age of 16. He attended a public meeting for freedom struggle which coincided with marriage ceremony of freedom fighter Maghfoor Ahmad Ajazi. In this meeting which was also attended by Shafi Daudi, Binda babu and Deep babu, anti-British Raj and pro-freedom slogans were raised.

References

1886 births
1968 deaths
Recipients of the Padma Bhushan in public affairs
People from Bihar